Christopher Mark Allan (born 27 September 1998) is an English footballer who plays as a midfielder for Charleston Battery in the USL Championship.

Career

Youth, college and amateur
Allan spent time with the Sunderland academy, before moving to the United States to play college soccer at the University of Charleston in 2019. He made 17 appearances, scoring 3 goals and tallying 3 assists for the Golden Eagles during their 2019 season.

In 2019, Allan also appeared for NPSL side Asheville City.

Professional
On 2 April 2021, Allan signed with USL Championship side Atlanta United 2. He made his debut on 24 April 2021, starting against Louisville City. Atlanta declined his contract option following the 2021 season.

Allan joined Memphis 901 FC on 21 January 2022. He made his debut against Pittsburgh Riverhounds on 13 March 2022. He scored his first goal for the club against Tampa Bay Rowdies on 28 April 2022.

On 20 December 2022, it was announced that Allan would join Charleston Battery for their 2023 season in the USL Championship on a multi-year contract.

References

External links

1998 births
Association football midfielders
Atlanta United 2 players
Charleston Battery players
Charleston Golden Eagles men's soccer players
Memphis 901 FC players
English expatriate footballers
English expatriate sportspeople in the United States
English footballers
Expatriate soccer players in the United States
Living people
National Premier Soccer League players
USL Championship players